Delbert is a given name. It is a short form of Adelbert, which is a combination of adal, meaning noble, and Bert meaning bright. Notable people with the name include:

Delbert F. Anderson (1919–1999), American farmer and politician
Delbert Baker, Seventh-day Adventist minister, author, educator, and administrator
Delbert Black (1922–2000), the first Master Chief Petty Officer of the Navy, from 1967 to 1971
Delbert Cowsette (born 1977), former American football defensive tackle in the National Football League
Delbert Daisey (born 1924), known as Cigar Daisey, American waterfowl wood carver
Delbert Day, American engineer and co-inventor of TheraSphere glass microspheres and glasphalt
Delbert Fowler (born 1958), former American football player for the Winnipeg Blue Bombers of the Canadian Football League
Delbert Ray Fulkerson (1924–1976), mathematician who co-developed the Ford–Fulkerson algorithm
Delbert Gee, judge of the Superior Court of California (USA) in Alameda County since 2002
Delbert W. Halsey (1919–1942), United States Navy officer, received the Navy Cross posthumously for actions in World War II
Delbert Hosemann (born 1947), the Republican Secretary of State of Mississippi
Delbert O. Jennings (1936–2003), United States Army soldier, recipient of the Medal of Honor for actions in the Vietnam War
Delbert Kirsch, Canadian provincial politician
Delbert Lamb (1914–2010), American speed skater who competed in the 1936 Winter Olympics and in the 1948 Winter Olympics
Delbert Latta or Del Latta (born 1920), former member of the United States House of Representatives
Delbert Mann (1920–2007), American television and film director
Delbert McClinton (born 1940), American blues rock and electric blues singer-songwriter, guitarist, harmonica player and pianist
Delbert Miller, member of the Wisconsin State Assembly
G. Delbert Morris (1909–1987), United States Republican politician who served in the California legislature
Delbert Philpott (1923–2005), American soldier and scientist
Delbert Riley, Canadian First Nations leader of Chippewa background
Delbert Lee Scott (born 1949), businessman and politician from Missouri
Delbert Spurlock (born 1941), US Assistant Secretary of the Army (1980–1989), Deputy Secretary of Labor (1991–1993)
Delbert L. Stapley (1896–1978), member of the Quorum of the Twelve Apostles in The Church of Jesus Christ of Latter-day Saints (1950–1978)
Delbert D. Thiessen or Del Thiessen, American psychology professor emeritus
Del Thompson (born 1958), American football player
Delbert Tibbs (1939–2013), American man wrongfully convicted of murder and rape in 1974 and sentenced to death
Delbert Leroy True (1923–2001), archaeologist who worked in California, particularly San Diego County, and in northern Chile
Del Webb (1899–1974), American real estate developer and a co-owner of the New York Yankees baseball club
Delbert Wilkins or Lenny Henry, CBE (born 1958), British actor, writer, comedian, co-founder of Comic Relief
Delbert E. Wong (1920–2006), the first Chinese American judge in the continental United States
Delbert Yocam (born 1943), American technology executive

See also
USS Delbert W. Halsey (DE-310), United States Navy Evarts-class destroyer escort launched during World War II but never completed
Delbert and Ora Chipman House on E. Main St. in American Fork, Utah, built c. 1870s
Delbert W. Meier House, modest houses designed by architect Frank Lloyd Wright
Debert
Dehl Berti
Elbert (disambiguation)
Gondelbert
Wandelbert

English masculine given names
French masculine given names
German masculine given names